The Blue Cave is a cave on Xiji Islet in Wang'an Township, Penghu, Taiwan. It is part of the South Penghu Marine National Park.

History
The cave was created by natural erosion.

Geology
The cave is prone to rock falls due to sea erosion and uneven surfaces.

References

Caves of Taiwan
Geography of Penghu County
Tourist attractions in Penghu County